Vojišnica is a village in central Croatia, in the municipality of Vojnić, Karlovac County. It is connected by the D6 highway.

History
During World War II, a large number of Serbs were massacred in the village by the Ustaše regime in June and July 1941.

Demographics
According to the 2011 census, the village of Kolarić 
has 404 inhabitants. This represents 63.52% of its pre-war population according to the 1991 census.

The 1991 census recorded that 97.17% of the village population were ethnic Serbs (618/636), 1.25% were Yugoslavs (8/636), 0.62% were Croats (4/636) and 0.96% were of other/unknown ethnic origin (6/636).

References

Populated places in Karlovac County
Serb communities in Croatia